"Bedtime Story" is a song by the Danish rock band Warm Guns. It was released as a single from the band's 1983 album Follow Your Heart Or Fall.

The Danish pop rock band TV-2 covered the song in 1993 on the  Lars Muhl tribute album From All of Us....

Track listing
 "Bedtime Story" (Muhl) – 2:59
 "Love Waits for No One" (Muhl) – 3:42

Personnel
 Lars Muhl – vocals, keyboards
 Lars Hybel – guitar
 Kaj Weber – bass
 Troels Møller – drums
 Pete Repete – keyboards
 Strings on "Love Waits For No One" arranged by Leif Pedersen

External links
 Bedtime Story on Discogs.com
 From All Of Us... on Discogs.com

1983 singles
1983 songs
Warm Guns songs
Vertigo Records singles